Elassodiscus is a genus of snailfishes native to the Pacific Ocean.

Species
There are currently three recognized species in this genus:
 Elassodiscus caudatus (C. H. Gilbert, 1915) (Blackbelly snailfish)
 Elassodiscus obscurus Pitruk & Fedorov, 1993
 Elassodiscus tremebundus C. H. Gilbert & Burke, 1912

References

Liparidae
Fish of the Pacific Ocean